The Nanning–Guangzhou high-speed railway, abbreviated as Nan–Guang railway, connects Nanning, capital of Guangxi Zhuang Autonomous Region, and Guangzhou, capital of Guangdong Province, in China. Construction started on November 9, 2008; Nanning to Wuzhou was completed by April 18, 2014, while the full route opened on December 26, 2014. The total cost was about 41 billion RMB. The railway is expected to spur economic development, and increase mobility across the Guangxi and western Guangdong regions.

Route
The railway travels mostly along the Pearl River Delta's Xi River valley. From Nanning it initially follows the route of the Liuzhou–Nanning Intercity Railway to Litang in Binyang County. It then heads eastward through Guigang, crossing the Yu River, over Guiping, Pingnan and Tengxian to Wuzhou. After entering Guangdong it passes Yunan and Yunfu to Zhaoqing, before reaching Guangzhou South railway station. Twenty-three stations will be built along the route, though not all will service passengers.

Technical standards
The railway is electrified, with a double track standard construction for high-speed passenger trains and fast freight trains. The  operating speed is 200 km/h for D (First Generation) Trains, and up to 250 km/h for G (Second Generation) Trains.

 Grade : national grade I
 The number of main lines: double
 Passenger train design speed: D Trains 200 km/h, G Trains 250 km/h
 Minimum curve radius : 3500m
 Limiting slope : Nanning to Guigang 12 ‰, Guigang to Guangzhou South 6 ‰
 Traction types : electric traction
 Traction Quality : 4000t
 Block mode : automatic block
 Construction Clearance: CDB double-stack container trains to meet the transport requirements.

Construction history
 November 9, 2008 – Construction started.
 October 10, 2009 – Breakthrough on the first tunnel.
 June 22, 2011 – Ceremony to commemorate the completion of construction work in Guangxi.
 May 22, 2012 – Songgen Yunan Tunnel, located in Yunfu City, Guangdong completed with a total length of 3,123 meters.
 March 4, 2014 – Northridge Hill Tunnel is completed, located in Zhaoqing, Guangdong Province. With a total length of 12,438 meters, it is the longest tunnel.
 April 18, 2014 – Guangxi segment of Nanning-Guangzhou railway opens. Nanning to Wuzhou now just takes two and a half hours.
 July 7, 2014 – Construction completed from Wuzhou to Zhaoqing.
 November 8, 2014 – The last section is completed and ready for final testing.
 December 26, 2014 – The whole line is opened to traffic.

Future development
Rail Tansport in Nanning
Nanning is already connected by conventional-speed rail to Vietnam, though Pingxiang on the China–Vietnam border. Nanning–Pingxiang high-speed railway is also under construction. This would allow high-speed trains from Guangzhou to Nanning to continue on to Vietnam and other countries in ASEAN, connecting with the Kunming–Singapore railway.

References 

High-speed railway lines in China
Rail transport in Guangdong
Rail transport in Guangxi
Railway lines opened in 2014